The sociological theory of diffusion is the study of the diffusion of innovations throughout social groups and organizations.  The topic has seen rapid growth since the 1990s, reflecting curiosity about the process of social change and "fueled by interest in institutional arguments and in network and dynamic analysis."  The theory uses a case study of the growth of business computing to explain different mechanisms of diffusion.

Origins of the sociological theory of diffusion
Diffusion emerged as a subfield in early 20th century rural sociology. Bryce Ryan and Neal Gross were influential in laying the initial groundwork on diffusion in sociology. Early studies explained how corn farmers adopted new variants of corn through social diffusion processes rather than economic ones.

The concept of diffusion

In the 1962 book, Diffusion of Innovations, Everett Rogers defines sociological diffusion of innovation as a process in a social system where an innovative idea or concept is spread by members of the social group through certain channels. He identifies four elements that influence how and how quickly a new idea spreads:
 The innovation itself
 The types of communication channels used
 The amount of time the social group is exposed to the innovation
 The nature of the social group
In a study by Surry and Farquhar, researchers explain that the theory of diffusion is used in occupations ranging from marketing to agriculture in order to ensure that new products, ideas, and techniques are well adopted by the social group.   The concept of diffusion is of particular interest in the marketing field, as this concept affects the success or failure of new ads or products. Understanding this theory helps marketers influence the way the public will perceive each innovation.

The speed at which an innovation spreads through a mass of people depends on how favorably an idea is perceived by the audience. Innovations that are ill matched with existing techniques are not as well accepted and diffused through the group. Social structures are naturally designed in a hierarchy; thus, different ideas follow different routes or courses in the hierarchy, depending on the type and source of an innovation.

The study of the diffusion of innovations has led to advancements in awareness of three important aspects of social change: the qualities of an innovation which lead to successful diffusion, the effect of peer networking and conversations when it comes to spreading ideas, and the importance of various "user segments" (Robinson). The theory of diffusion of innovations differs from other theories about the processes of change since most changes are improvements, or "reinventions", of a previously existing product or technique. These changes are generally favorably perceived by the members of the group because they usually are more in line with the values and needs of the group.

There are five important qualities that factor into the success or failure of innovations. First, the relative advantage; that is, whether the new innovation surpasses similar existing ideas in terms of satisfaction and convenience. Second, the compatibility of the new idea with the needs and practices of the group members. Third, the simplicity of the innovation: usually, the simpler the innovation, the more quickly the concept is adopted. Fourth, the "trialability" of an innovation; that is, whether it can be tested without commitment for a period of time. An innovation that has an available trial period provides less uncertainty to the group member who will be trying it. Lastly, whether there are observable results with use of the innovation. The more positive and visible results, the higher the likelihood it gets adopted as a permanent idea for the group.

Why diffusion happens
Sociological diffusion occurs when a social group or organization develops an innovation: a new idea or behavior. Diffusion, in the context of corporations and businesses, is a way for an idea to be fleshed out. The diffusion of innovations provides insights into the process of social change: one can observe the qualities that make an innovation successfully spread and the importance of communication and networks. According to Rogers, a new idea is diffused through a decision-making process with five steps:

Knowledge - An individual first becomes aware of the new innovation, but lacks information and inspiration
Persuasion - The individual's interest in the innovation spikes, and he or she begins research
Decision - The individual weighs the positive and negative results of changing to the new idea 
Implementation - The individual adds the innovation into the system. At this stage, he or she also begins to determine the innovation's usefulness.
Confirmation - The individual decides to continue with the new innovation.

The key part of the five stages is the decision; this is the main reason why diffusion exists. The decision to either adopt or reject the idea is vitally important. Those responsible for evaluating innovations either determine that the new concept is likely to provide future success, and adopt it, or determine that it is likely to be a failure, and continue to move forward in search of other ideas. It is counterproductive for an organization to invest time, energy, and in most cases money, into a poorly developed or bad idea.

An important aspect of the diffusion and decision process is communication. As an idea further develops and spreads, it flows and moves through an organization by communication. Communication is a necessary condition for an idea to take hold. The innovation depends on a communication network within the organization in order to take root. In Emanuel Rosen's book The Anatomy of Buzz, Rosen points out the importance of communication networks in the spread and development of an idea within an organizational system. (Dobson)

Studies of the diffusion of innovation have shown that new ideas must fit with already established system in order for changes not only to occur, but also to occur easily. (Pinard) An innovation faced with structural or ideological barriers cannot diffuse. On the other hand, if a new idea or innovation has few obstacles and acknowledges places where change is logical, movement to it will occur. (Freeman)

Networks and environment
A firm's interaction with other players, along with its environment and organizational culture, are key in the social theory of diffusion.

The use of networks
The effects of networks and institutional environment on adoption of innovations can be explained using a social network theory model. In such a model, nodes represent agents (e.g. companies or organizations) and ties represent a connection between two entities (e.g. a company-client relationship or competitive relationship). Diffusion occurs when a novel idea, product, or process is implemented by an agent and permeates through these ties to others.

Internal and external diffusion
Diffusion of information and ideas has been categorized into two modes:

Internal diffusion is the spread of information and innovations within a network, flowing within a single adopting population a given industry or geographical network. Internal diffusion dynamics require that innovative and early adopter firms introduce new ideas into a network, which are then picked up by the majority of firms and laggard firms. DiMaggio and Powell (1983)  argue that firms search for the best ideas and practices and mimic new ideas that prove to work. This phenomenon is known as mimetic isomorphism, and ironically may lead to clustering of firm structure and practices. Additionally, firms are often forced to adopt new ideas as they are constantly competing with other firms; that is, firms want to seem modernized and seek legitimacy in implementing innovative practices.
 
External diffusion refers to the introduction of ideas to a network from outside actors: firms or other agents on the edge of the network. Outside actors include the mass media and "change agents." Mass media can amplify trends and movements that occur in the marketplace, introducing new innovations to network members, exposing "best-practice" ideas, and conveying new principles. Change agents are usually business professionals (such as lawyers, consultants, bankers, or politicians) who spread new practices or aid in promoting new ideas.  These individuals often introduce business models, legal strategies, or investment techniques that are picked up by several entities within a network and continue to diffuse. Often, such external diffusion leads to conformity of a set of corporate strategies or structures, a phenomenon DiMaggio and Powell called "normative isomorphism".

Environmental and cultural factors of diffusion
An agent's environmental and cultural makeup influence the decision to adopt an idea diffusing through a network. Some of the major characteristics of firms that influence their decision to innovate are clustering, weak ties, and firm size.
 
Clustering', the existence of a group of tightly connected agents, is a frequent concept in network theory. It includes, for example, similar firms locating themselves in close proximity to each other (Silicon Valley for technology firms; New York for banking services). Such clustering and close proximity increases the diffusion rate of ideas for firms within a cluster, as other firms are more likely to adopt an idea if another firm has adopted it within its cluster.
 
An agent with weak ties has a connection to two or more clusters. These agents are integral in connecting groups, as they provide communication between large clusters. Firms with weak ties can be isolated firms, firms with business in two or more spaces, or those which are external change agents. Firms with weak ties introduce clusters to new, proven methods.
 
Firm size has been shown to have an influence on the rate of diffusion. Strang and Soule (1998) have shown that large, technical, and specialized organizations with informal cultures tend to innovate much faster than other firms. Smaller and more rigid firms attempt to mimic these "early adopters" in attempt to keep up with competition.

Mathematical treatment

Mathematical models can be used to study the spread of technological innovations among individuals connected to each other by a network of peer-to-peer influences, such as in a physical community or neighborhood.

Complex system (particularly complex network) models can be used to represent a system of individuals as nodes'' in a network (or Graph (discrete mathematics)). The interactions that link these individuals are represented by the edges of the network and can be based on the probability or strength of social connections.  In the dynamics of such models, each node is assigned a current state, indicating whether or not the individual has adopted the innovation, and model equations are used to describe the evolution of these states over time.

In threshold models the uptake of technologies is determined by the balance of two factors: the (perceived) usefulness (sometimes called utility) of the innovation to the individual as well as barriers to adoption, such as cost. The multiple parameters that influence decisions to adopt, both individual and socially motivated, can be represented by such mathematical models.

Computer models have been developed to investigate the balance between the social aspects of diffusion and perceived intrinsic benefit to the individuals. When the effect of each individual node was analyzed along with its influence over the entire network, the expected level of adoption was seen to depend on the number of initial adopters and the structure and properties of the network. Two factors in particular emerged as important to successful spread of the innovation: The number of connections of nodes with their neighbors, and the presence of a high degree of common connections in the network (quantified by the clustering coefficient).

Case study: Diffusion of business computing in organizations 

To illustrate how different diffusion mechanisms can have varying effects in individual cases, consider the example of business computing. The 1980s and 1990s saw a rapid paradigm shift in the way many organizations operated; specifically, the rise of computers and related technologies saw organizations adopt these innovations to help run their business (Attewell 1992:1). Thus, the diffusion of business computing through organizations during this time period provides an informative case study through which to examine different mechanisms of diffusion and their respective roles.

Networks 
The roles of communication networks, as described by traditional theories of diffusion, have been to facilitate information flow about a new innovation and thus remove one of the major barriers to adoption. In this model, those closest to the initial champions of a new innovation are quicker to respond and adopt, while those farther away will take more time to respond (Rogers 1983; Strang and Soule 1998:272). This theory about the roles of networks in diffusion, while widely applicable, requires modification in this particular case, among others. Attewell (1992) argues that in this case, knowledge of the existence of computers and their business applications far preceded their eventual adoption. The main barrier to adoption was not awareness, but technical knowledge: knowledge of how to effectively integrate computing into the workplace. Thus, the most relevant networks to the diffusion of business computing were those networks that transmitted the technical knowledge required to utilize the innovation, not those that simply transmitted awareness of the idea behind the innovation.

Institutions 
New institutions, in particular those which acted as educators or consultants, also played an important role in the diffusion of business computing. In order to adapt to evolving trends in business computing, organizations first needed to gain the technical knowledge necessary to operate the technology (Attewell 1992:3-6). The "knowledge barrier" could be reduced or partially circumvented, however, by the formation of new institutions. The new institutions that formed during this time period such as service bureaus, consultants, and companies creating simplifications of the technology lowered the knowledge barrier and allow for more rapid diffusion of the ideas and technology behind business computing. This explains the phenomenon in which, at first, many organizations obtained business computing as an out-sourced service. However, after these service institutions effectively lowered the barrier to adoption, many organizations became capable of bringing business computing in-house (Attewell 1992:7-8).

Innovation decisions 
Rogers (1983) notes two important ways in which innovations are adopted by organizations: collective innovation decisions, and authority innovation decisions. "Collective innovation decisions" are best defined as a decision that occurs as the result of a broad consensus for change within an organization. "Authority innovation decisions", on the other hand, need only the consensus of a few individuals with large amounts of power within the organization. In the case of organizations adopting business computing, authority decisions were largely impossible. As J.D. Eveland and L. Tornatzky (1990)  explain, when dealing with advanced technical systems such as those involved with business computing, “decisions are often many (and reversed), and technologies are often too big and complex to be grasped by a single person's cognitive power or usually, to be acquired or deployed within the discretionary authority of  any single organizational participant." Therefore, a much broader consensus within an organization was required to reach the critical mass of technical knowledge and authority necessary to adapt to business computing. This provided an opportunity for collective innovation decisions within the organization.

See also
Network theory
 Diffusion of innovations

References

Social networks